Clytra is a genus of short-horned leaf beetles belonging to the family Chrysomelidae, subfamily Cryptocephalinae.

Species
 Clytra aliena Weise, 1897
 Clytra annamita Lefevre, 1889
 Clytra appendicina Lacordaire, 1848
 Clytra arida Weise, 1889
 Clytra atraphaxidis (Pallas, 1773)
 Clytra binominata Monrós, 1953
 Clytra bodemeyeri Weise, 1900
 †Clytra carbonaria von Heyden & von Heyden, 1865
 Clytra cingulata Weise, 1898
 Clytra duodecimmaculata (Fabricius, 1775)
 Clytra espanoli Daccordi & Petitpierre, 1977
 Clytra gracilis (Lacordaire, 1848)
 †Clytra greithiana Heer, 1847
 Clytra jacobsoni Semenov, 1903
 Clytra laeviuscula Ratzeburg, 1837
 Clytra nigrocincta Lacordaire, 1848
 Clytra novempunctata G.A. Olivier, 1808
 Clytra orientalis Lefevre, 1891
 Clytra ovata (Lacordaire, 1848)
 †Clytra pandorae Heer, 1847
 Clytra quadripunctata (Linnaeus, 1758)
 Clytra rotundata L. Medvedev, 1961
 Clytra rufina (Solsky, 1881)
 Clytra subfasciata Lacordaire, 1848
 Clytra subviridis Pic, 1932
 Clytra unifasciata (Pic, 1941)
 Clytra valeriana Ménétries, 1832
 Clytra variegata (Lefevre, 1890)

References
BioLib
Fauna Europaea
Chrysomelidae of Europe

Clytrini
Chrysomelidae genera
Beetles of Europe
Taxa named by Johann Nepomuk von Laicharting